Defensin, alpha 5 (DEFA5) also known as human alpha defensin 5  (HD5) is a protein that in humans is encoded by the DEFA5 gene.  DEFA5 is expressed in the Paneth cells of the ileum.

Defensins are a family of microbicidal and cytotoxic peptides (antimicrobial peptides; AMP) that are involved in host defense, and help to maintain homeostasis of intestinal microbiota. DEFA5 is the main AMP that controls the enteric microbiota composition by selective killing of bacterial pathogens while preserving commensals.

Structure 
Defensins are small cationic peptides linked via three intra-molecular disulfide bridges, and contain six intra-molecular cysteine residues which form an unalterable and specific pattern of disulfide bridges which protects them from proteolysis and maintains function in the intestinal lumen. Members of the defensin family are highly similar in protein sequence and distinguished by a conserved cysteine motif.

Gene and tissue distribution 

Several of the human alpha defensin genes appear to be clustered on chromosome 8. The protein encoded by this gene, α-defensin-5, is highly expressed in the secretory granules of Paneth cells of the ileum.

Function 

In addition to antimicrobial activity, inactivation and neutralization of several bacterial toxins, especially an inhibitory potency against Clostridioides difficile toxins were reported. α-defensin-5 is able to inhibit all three C. difficile toxins A (TcdA), B (TcdB) and CDT in the concentration-dependent manner, and inhibitory mechanism is different for each of them. TcdA and TcdB are inhibited by co-precipitation with DEFA5, and CDT is inhibited by the inactivation of the CDTb pore. In addition to toxin neutralization, DEFA5 is capable to direcrly kill C. difficile cells by damaging the bacterial wall

References

Further reading 

 
 
 
 
 
 
 
 
 

Defensins